Susan Donovan is an American author of romance novels and women's fiction. Her novel Take a Chance on Me won the 2003 Best Contemporary Romance Award Winner from Romantic Times. Two of her novels – The Kept Woman and Not That Kind of Girl were selected as RITA Award Finalists by the Romance Writers of America. 
Before writing her novels, she was a journalist, and studied at Northwestern University's Medill School of Journalism. She lives in New Mexico with her family and labradoodle.

Bibliography

Novels 

He Loves Lucy (St. Martin's Press, Dec 2002)
Knock Me Off My Feet (St. Martin's Press, Dec 2002)
Take a Chance on Me (St. Martin's Press, Aug 2003)
Public Displays of Affection (St. Martin's Press, Jun 2004)
The Kept Woman (St. Martin's Press, Jun 2006)
The Girl Most Likely To... (St. Martin's Press, Dec 2008)
 Unbound with Celeste Bradley (St. Martin's Press, 2012)
 Previously published as A Courtesan's Guide to Getting Your Man (St. Martin's Press, May 2011)
 Chestnuts Roasting (Kindle, Oct 2016, novella)
 Previously published as Turning Up the Heat in Jingle Bell Rock

San Francisco Dog-Walking Group Series 

 Ain't Too Proud to Beg (St. Martin's Press, Nov 2009)
 The Night She Got Lucky (St. Martin's Press, May 2010)
 Not That Kind of Girl (St. Martin's Press, Nov 2010)

Bigler, North Carolina Series 

 Cheri on Top (St. Martin's Press, Aug 2011)
 I Want Candy (St. Martin's Press, Feb 2012)
 Stealing Taffy (St. Martin's Press, Aug 2016)

Bayberry Island Series

Contributions to Series by Multiple Authors

12 Days of Christmas 
#1 A Partridge in the Au Pair's Tree (Amazon Story Front, Dec 2013)

Anthologies and Collections

Writing as Pebbles Rocksoff

Short Stories 

The Bodice Raptor, Amazon Digital Services, 2013
Rex and the Single Girl, Amazon Digital Services, 2013

References

External links

 Publisher's Author Page

Living people
21st-century American novelists
American women novelists
American romantic fiction writers
21st-century American women writers
Medill School of Journalism alumni
Year of birth missing (living people)